Nick Carr is the debut album by Greek singer-songwriter and record producer Nikos Karvelas under the stage name of Nick Carr, released independently in 1985. It is all English-language material.

Track listing

External links 
 Official site

1985 debut albums
Albums produced by Nikos Karvelas
Concept albums
Nikos Karvelas albums